Robert Bowes may refer to:
 Robert Bowes (lawyer) (1495–1554), English Master of the Rolls and warden on the Scottish border
 Robert Bowes (diplomat) (1535–1597), English diplomat, MP for Knaresborough, Carlisle, Appleby and Cumberland
 Robert Bowes (died 1600) (1553–1600), MP for Thirsk and Richmond
 Robert Bowes (publisher) (1835–1919), Scottish bookseller, publisher, and bibliographer
 Bob Bowes (1922–1979), English teacher and actor
 Robert Bowes (surgeon) (died 1803), president of the Royal College of Surgeons in Ireland